Sirok is a historic village (population 2,100) in Heves county in Hungary, situated near Eger in Mátra mountains. Today it is most known for its 13th-century castle ruins.

Etymology
The name comes from the Slavic širokъ—wide like Široka Planina, Široký Důl and many other similar Slavic names.

References

Populated places in Heves County